Monica Falkner (born 1996) is a netball player from New Zealand. As of the end of 2021, she had represented the New Zealand national netball team on three occasions.

Early life
Monica Falkner was born on 8 April 1996 in Ōpōtiki in the eastern Bay of Plenty in the North Island of New Zealand. Falkner is descended from the Māori people of Tūhoe and Whakatohea. She was brought up by her father on a farm in the Waimana valley of Whakatāne District in the Bay of Plenty region and attended Trident High School in Whakatāne. She started to play netball at the age of eight.

Netball career
Falkner joined the Waikato Bay of Plenty Magic for the 2017 season, playing in the Goal shooter (GS) and Goal attack (GA) positions. That year she was selected to play for the New Zealand Youth Team in the 2017 Netball World Youth Cup. The tournament was won by New Zealand. She was selected for the full national squad, known as the Silver Ferns, for 2017-18 but did not play in any matches, although she did play in the 2018 Fast5 Netball World Series which New Zealand won. At the end of 2019 she suffered an anterior cruciate ligament injury, a common problem for netball players, and was out of the game for 15 months. After recovering, she made her debut for the Silver Ferns in October 2020, against England in the 2020 Taini Jamison Trophy Series, being the 176th women to play for the team. For the 2021 season she joined the Northern Stars but her playing time was limited by a further injury to the same knee. She transferred to the Northern Mystics for the 2022 season.

References

External link
Falkner talks of her life and career

1996 births
Living people
New Zealand netball players
New Zealand international netball players
Waikato Bay of Plenty Magic players
Northern Stars players
Northern Mystics players
ANZ Premiership players
Sirens Netball players
People from Ōpōtiki
Ngāi Tūhoe people
Whakatōhea people
People educated at Trident High School
Sportspeople from the Bay of Plenty Region
New Zealand Māori netball players
New Zealand international Fast5 players